Kakana may refer to:

 Kakana, Car Nicobar, a village in Andaman & Nicobar Islands, India
 Kakana, Nancowry, a village in Andaman & Nicobar Islands, India